Roger J. Donnahoo (born August 5, 1937- deceased August 4, 2020) is a former American football player who played with the New York Titans. He played college football at Michigan State University.

References

1937 births
Living people
American football defensive backs
Michigan State Spartans football players
New York Titans (AFL) players
Players of American football from South Carolina
Sportspeople from Greenville, South Carolina